This is a list of conference champions in sports sponsored by the Mountain West Conference, which sponsors eight men's and ten women's  sports.

Member schools

Current members

 Air Force (since 1999)
 Boise State (since 2011)
 Colorado State (since 1999)
 Fresno State (since 2012)
 Nevada (since 2012)
 New Mexico (since 1999)
 San Diego State (since 1999)
 San Jose State (since 2013)
 UNLV (since 1999)
 Utah State (since 2013)
 Wyoming (since 1999)

Former members

 BYU: 1999–2010
 TCU: 2005–2011
 Utah: 1999–2010

Note: All years indicated are through the school year academic term, where it is assumed that a school year begins in fall 1999 and ends in spring 2023.

Current champions

As of March 19, 2023

Men's sports

Women's sports

Men's Basketball

Champions

† – A champion can claim two championships, where one is from the regular season and the other is from a postseason tournament.

Women's Basketball

Champions

† – A champion can claim two championships, where one is from the regular season and the other is from a postseason tournament.

Men's Cross Country

Champions

Women's Cross Country

Champions

Football

Affiliate Members

 Hawaii (since 2012)

Note: All years indicated in this table reflect college football seasons, which are held during the opening fall term of the academic year.

Champions

Men's Golf

Champions

Women's Golf

Champions

Men's Indoor Track & Field

Champions

Women's Indoor Track & Field

Champions

Soccer

Affiliate Members

 Colorado College (since 2014)

Note: All years indicated in this table reflect college soccer seasons, which are held during the opening fall term of the academic year.

Champions

Softball

Champions

† – From the formation of the MW in 1999 (2000 softball season) through 2006, a champion could claim two championships, with one from the regular season and the other from a postseason tournament. The MW abolished its softball tournament after the 2006 season (2005–06 school year).

Swimming and Diving

Champions

† – A champion can claim two championships, where one is from the regular season and the other is from a postseason tournament. The champion is determined by regular season play prior to the 2002–03 and 2010–11 thereafter.

Volleyball

Note: All years indicated in this table reflect college women's volleyball seasons, which are held during the opening fall term of the academic year. (This contrasts with men's volleyball, a sport not sponsored by the MW, whose season is in the spring term.)

Champions

† – From the formation of the MW in 1999 through the 2007 season (2007–08 school year), and also in the 2011 season, a champion could claim two championships, one from the regular season and the other from a postseason tournament. The MW abolished its women's volleyball tournament after its 2007 edition, and has held it in only one season since then (2011).

Conference championships

Men's championship winners

Source:
Notes
 The regular-season championships in men's and women's tennis were discontinued after the 2012–13 school year, but returned in 2015–16.

Women's championship winners

Notes
 The softball tournament was discontinued after the 2006 season.
 The regular-season championships in men's and women's tennis were discontinued after the 2012–13 school year, but returned in 2015–16.

See also
 List of Mountain West Conference football standings

References

Champions
Mountain West